Sarena Parmar is a Canadian actress.

Early life 
Parmar was born in Prince George and raised in Kelowna, British Columbia, Parmar later went on to graduate from The National Theatre School of Canada. Her family is originally from Punjab, India.

Career 
Parmar is best known for her role as Chandra Mehta on the television show How to Be Indie. She has also starred in Disney Channel Original Movie Radio Rebel, as Audrey Sharma.

In 2013, she starred in The Animal Project, which premiered at the 2013 Toronto International Film Festival.

In the Summer of 2018, she starred in "The Orchard (After Chekhov)", a play she also wrote, at the Shaw Festival in Niagara-on-the-Lake, Ontario, Canada.

Filmography

References

External links
 

Living people
People from Prince George, British Columbia
Canadian people of Punjabi descent
Canadian television actresses
Canadian actresses of Indian descent
Actresses from British Columbia
Year of birth missing (living people)